Helvetia Village Historic District is a national historic district located at Helvetia, Randolph County, West Virginia.  It encompasses 26 contributing buildings in the village center.  Some of the buildings date to the original settlement period in 1869–1870, when they were built of log construction.  Later 19th-century and early-20th century buildings are of frame construction, with a number in the Carpenter Gothic style. Notable buildings include The Church (1882), Huber Inn (c. 1880), Post Office and Store / house (1920s), the log Swiss Museum (c. 1869), Star Band Hall, Cheese Haus, an original cabin (1870), Helvetia Community Hall (1939), and Rudolph's Carpenter Shop.

It was listed on the National Register of Historic Places in 1978.

References

National Register of Historic Places in Randolph County, West Virginia
Historic districts in Randolph County, West Virginia
Carpenter Gothic architecture in West Virginia
German-American culture in West Virginia
Swiss-American culture in West Virginia
Historic districts on the National Register of Historic Places in West Virginia
Log buildings and structures on the National Register of Historic Places in West Virginia
1978 establishments in West Virginia